A5 Road may refer to:
Africa
A5 highway (Nigeria), a road connecting Lagos and Ibadan
 A5 road (Zimbabwe), a road connecting Harare and Francistown 
Americas
 Quebec Autoroute 5, a road in Quebec, Canada
 County Route A5 (California) or Bowman Road, California, USA
 A005 road (Argentina), a road connecting National Route 8 and National Route 36 in the city of Río Cuarto, Córdoba Province

Asia
 A5 road (Malaysia), a road in Sabah connecting the Route A4 (Sandakan) and Tawau
 A 5 road (Sri Lanka), a road connecting  Peradeniya and Chenkaladi via Badulla
 A5 road, an expressway in China connecting A4 Shanyang Interchange and Jiangsu Province Boundary

Australasia
 A5 highway (Queensland), a road connecting Goondiwindi and Westwood
 A5 highway (South Australia), a road connecting the city centre of Adelaide to the beachside suburb of Glenelg
 A5 highway (Tasmania), a road connecting Melton Mowbray and Deloraine

British Isles
 A5 road (Great Britain), a road connecting London in England and Holyhead in Wales
 A5 road (Isle of Man), a road connecting Douglas with Port Erin
 A5 road (Northern Ireland), a road connecting Derry and the border in the Republic of Ireland

Continental Europe
 A5 motorway (Austria), a road connecting Vienna and Drasenhofen on the Czech border
 A5 motorway (Bulgaria), a road connecting Varna and Burgas
 A5 motorway (Croatia), a road connecting Sredanci (A3 motorway) and Osijek
 A5 motorway (Cyprus), a road connecting the A1 motorway (at the level of Kofinou village) with the A3 near Larnaca
 A5 motorway (France), a road connecting the Parisian region with the Langres area
 A5 motorway (Germany), a road connecting Hattenbach and the Swiss border near Basel
A5 motorway (Greece), a road connecting Ioannina and Patras
 A5 motorway (Italy), a road connecting Turin and the Mont-Blanc Tunnel
 A5 road (Latvia), a road connecting Riga and Salaspils - Babīte
 A5 highway (Lithuania), a road connecting Kaunas to the Poland border
 A5 motorway (Netherlands), a road connecting Amsterdam and Hoofddorp
 A5 motorway (Portugal), a road connecting Lisbon and Cascais
 A5 motorway (Romania), a planned road intended to connect Ploieşti and Albiţa and the Moldovan border
 A5 motorway (Slovenia), a road connecting Dragučova A1 interchange north of Maribor and Pince at the Hungarian border
 A-5 motorway (Spain), a road connecting Madrid and Badajoz, at the Portuguese border
 A5 motorway (Switzerland), a road connecting Luterbach (Solothurn) and  Yverdon

See also
 List of highways numbered 5